Airborne Command & Control Squadron 125 (VAW-125), known as the "Torch Bearers" or "Tigertails", was established on 1 October 1968, at Naval Air Station Norfolk.  The squadron's initial supporting command was Carrier Air Wing Three (CVW-3) deploying aboard .

The squadron is equipped with the E-2 Hawkeye. It was the first east coast squadron with E-2B's in 1968, among the first to operate the E-2C in 1975, receiving the E-2C 2000 in its first operational year in 2003, and the first unit to operate the E-2D Advanced Hawkeye in 2014.

Squadron History

1970s

In December 1976, Vice Admiral Howard E. Greer, COMNAVAIRLANT, presented VAW-125 with the COMNAVAIRLANT Battle "E" for readiness, the CINCLANTFLT "Golden Anchor" Award for career retention, and the CNO Safety "S" Award.  VAW-125 is believed to be the first Navy unit to win all three awards in the same year.

On 14 January 1978, the squadron suffered the loss of an aircraft (BuNo 159107) and the deaths of three aviators.  In June, VAW-125 took the E-2C's newest weapons system upgrade, the Advanced Radar Processing System (ARPS), to sea for the first time.  The squadron then assigned to Carrier Air Wing Seventeen (CVW-17) in November 1979, with the squadron making their eighth Mediterranean Sea deployment, this time aboard .

1980s

While deployed in August 1981, VAW-125 participated in Freedom of Navigation (FON) Operations & Open Ocean Missile (OOM) Exercise in the Central Mediterranean Sea and Gulf of Sitra, during which two Libyan MiGs were destroyed after attacking Battle Group aircraft. Upon return from deployment, the squadron provided range control services for the second launch of the NASA space shuttle, STS-2, and detection and monitoring services in the first E-2C Counter-Drug tasking, Operation Thunderbolt.

While on a routine deployment in October 1985, the squadron assisted in the successful intercept of the Egyptian airliner carrying the hijackers of the Italian cruise ship, MS Achille Lauro. Squadron aircrew spoke directly to the hijackers, convincing them that the communications were coming from the two VF-103 AND VF-74 F-14s on their wing and persuading the airliner to divert into NAS Sigonella, Sicily.

From January to March 1986, the squadron participated in "Freedom of Navigation" operations off the coast of Libya which escalated with the Action in the Gulf of Sidra in March.  In August 1988, the squadron deployed aboard  for an "Around the Horn" cruise to San Diego, California.

1990s
In August 1990, CVW-17 aboard USS Saratoga responded to the invasion of Kuwait by deploying to the Red Sea. VAW-125 and VAW-126 E-2Cs flew around-the-clock as the force build-up of Operation Desert Shield continued. VAW-125 flew over 890 combat hours controlling strikes on Iraqi targets while providing AEW coverage for the Red Sea Battle Group.  On a 17 January 1991 strike, squadron aircrew detected two Iraqi MiG-21s threatening the strike group. Controllers vectored two VFA-81 F/A-18s toward the MiGs which recorded the only Navy fixed-wing air-to-air kills of Operation Desert Storm.

In January 1994, the squadron deployed aboard USS Saratoga for her final cruise. During the deployment, the squadron joined NATO forces flying in support of Operations Deny Flight and Provide Promise. The squadron conducted operational tests of the Navy's newest Mini-DAMA Satellite Communication Suite, using this new system, the squadron, for the first time, functioned as an Airborne Battlefield Command and Control Center (ABCCC). With the decommissioning of USS Saratoga, VAW-125 and CVW-17 were deployed aboard . After completing a two-month Counter-Drug assignment at NS Roosevelt Roads, the squadron deployed to the Mediterranean Sea aboard USS Enterprise in June 1996. In July, the squadron again joined NATO forces in the former Yugoslavia, this time in support of Operation Joint Endeavor. In September, USS Enterprise moved to respond to mounting tensions in Southwest Asia, supporting Operation Southern Watch over the next three months. Squadron pilots earned the CVW-17 "Top Hook" Award for carrier landing performance and the squadron was recognized for its achievements in 1996, being awarded the COMNAVAIRLANT Battle Efficiency Award, the CNO Safety Award, and the VAW community's AEW Excellence Award.

2000s

Squadron aircraft flew numerous command and control missions in the New York City vicinity in the days following the attacks as commercial air traffic slowly resumed. During this cruise, the squadron surpassed a 32-year Class "A" mishap-free milestone with over 64,000 flight hours.

In April 2003, the squadron became the first East Coast squadron to transition to the E-2C Hawkeye 2000, which boasted improved electrical and vapor cycle systems, mission computer and display stations, and Cooperative Engagement Capability (CEC).  The squadron participated in the Operational Evaluation of the AN/USG-3 airborne node of the Navy's net-centric CEC sensor fusion system.

While deployed aboard  in the Central Persian Gulf, North Arabian Sea, and Western Indian Ocean VAW-125 played roles in the US War on Terror, Operation Enduring Freedom, and operations off the coast of Somalia.

2010s

In January 2010, the squadron was deployed to Naval Station Guantanamo Bay, Cuba, in support of Operation Unified Response providing humanitarian assistance following the 2010 Haiti earthquake. The squadron flew missions to provide communications relay, command and control, and general airborne radar services allowing forces afloat and ashore to distribute thousands of tons of rations, water, and medical supplies. The squadron then joined  on its trip around South America as it returned from Norfolk to its home port in San Diego.

On 2 February 2017, VAW-125 arrived at Marine Corps Air Station Iwakuni, Japan. It replaced VAW-115 in Carrier Air Wing Five aboard the aircraft carrier . The squadron made its first deployment aboard Ronald Reagan from 16 May to 9 August 2017.

2020s

Deployments and awards

Shipborne deployments and assignments

Awards
VAW-125 has been presented with the following unit awards and campaign medals:

See also
 History of the United States Navy
 List of United States Navy aircraft squadrons

References

External links
 US Navy Patrol Squadrons
 Official VAW-125 Website
 Globalsecurity.org – VAW-125

Early warning squadrons of the United States Navy